Avdonin (masculine) or Adonina (feminine) is a Russian last name. Variants of this last name include Avdokhin/Avdokhina (/), Avdoshin/Avdoshina (/), Avdyunin/Avdyunina (/), and Avdyushin/Avdyushina (/).

They all derive from the Russian given names Avdey (or its rare form Avdon) (male)—meaning servant, servile—and Yevdokiya (or its form Avdotya) (female)—meaning benevolence, acceptance, goodwill.

People with the last name
Alexander Avdonin (b. 1932), the first known person to start exhuming the grave of the murdered royal Romanov family
Juri Avdonin, Estonian association football player for Tartu JK Welco Elekter
Tatiana Avdonina, Belarusian water skier, 2000 trick cable ski champion
Yelena Avdonina, librarian, casualty of the 2004 Beslan school hostage crisis

Fictional characters
Avdonina, a character from the 1991 movie Khishchniki; played by Svetlana Nemolyaeva

References

Notes

Sources
Ю. А. Федосюк (Yu. A. Fedosyuk). "Русские фамилии: популярный этимологический словарь" (Russian Last Names: a Popular Etymological Dictionary). Москва, 2006. 



Russian-language surnames
Russian culture